Conrado Welsh (1908 – 1954) was a Chilean footballer. He played in three matches for the Chile national football team in 1935. He was also part of Chile's squad for the 1935 South American Championship.

References

1908 births
1954 deaths
Chilean footballers
Chile international footballers
Association football defenders
Colo-Colo footballers
Everton de Viña del Mar footballers